Roanoke station is a train station in Roanoke, Virginia, the current terminus of Amtrak's Northeast Regional line. Built in 2017, it follows several other Roanoke passenger stations that operated from the 1850s to 1979. The unstaffed station consists of a single high-level platform with no station building or waiting room available for passengers. All tickets must be purchased in advance; there is no Quik-Trak kiosk at the station.

History

Early history
By the time of its 1852 incorporation, the town of Big Lick was already established as a transportation hub for western Virginia, thanks to its position on the Great Wagon Road and the Wilderness Trail. The Virginia and Tennessee Railroad was completed from Lynchburg to Big Lick that same year, and on to Bristol in 1856. The Virginia and Tennessee became part of the Atlantic, Mississippi and Ohio Railroad in 1870, which itself emerged from bankruptcy and was renamed as the Norfolk and Western Railway (N&W) in 1882.

The Shenandoah Valley Railroad was completed to the town (newly renamed Roanoke) from Hagerstown, Maryland, in 1882, and acquired by the N&W in 1890. Its unbuilt southern section was eventually completed as the Roanoke and Southern Railroad (the "Punkin Vine") in 1892 and immediately leased to the N&W.

In 1905, the N&W constructed a station to replace the half-century-old depot.

The Virginian Railway was completed in 1909; a competitor to the N&W, it ran along a separate route along the Roanoke River.

End of service
The last train from Roanoke south (#11, and #12 northbound) to Winston-Salem on the "Punkin Vine" was on February 18, 1961. The "Punkin Vine" service was timed to connect with Powhatan Arrow trains to and from Norfolk. Through sleepers were then still operated on the N&W's #1/#2 Shenandoah Valley train between Roanoke and New York (via Hagerstown and Harrisburg) on the Pennsylvania Railroad (PRR) and the N&W. The PRR discontinued service between Harrisburg and Hagerstown on February 25, 1962, and the N&W between Hagerstown and Waynesboro on June 10; the sleepers were rerouted via the Chesapeake and Ohio Railroad. The last sleeper between Roanoke and Waynesboro ran on October 27, 1962, although local service continued until February 1963.

This left Roanoke with only east-west passenger service for the first time since 1882. The N&W continued to run trains, including the express Norfolk-Cincinnati Pocahontas and the local train on the same route, the Powhatan Arrow. The N&W also operated the north-south Birmingham-Washington Birmingham Special (unnamed after February 1970 and cut back to Bristol in August 1970) and the Pelican (discontinued, 1970) until April 30, 1971. The N&W operated the last east-west train, the Pocahantas, up to the same date. When Amtrak took over most intercity passenger service on May 1, none of the last three trains were included in its basic system, and Roanoke ceased to have passenger rail service.

1970s Amtrak service

Service was restored on March 24, 1975, with the introduction of the Mountaineer service between Norfolk and Chicago. Unlike most stations on the route, Amtrak did not reuse the former N&W station. Instead, an asphalt platform was built off Shenandoah Avenue near 4th Street,  to the west.

The Mountaineer was replaced by the Hilltopper on June 1, 1977. The Hilltopper was discontinued on October 1, 1979, ending rail service to Roanoke for the second time. For the next four decades, Roanoke's only link to the national railroad system was an Amtrak Thruway Motorcoach route that connected Roanoke to Lynchburg via the Crescent and later a Northeast Regional frequency.

Current service

From 1996 to 2007, six studies examined the proposed Transdominion Express project, which would have created two intercity rail routes from Bristol to Richmond and Washington, both via Roanoke. The last of these predicted poor ridership and low farebox recovery, and the state government abandoned the idea. But the research also suggested that Amtrak should increase service along Virginia's busiest corridors.  One daily Northeast Regional round trip was extended to Lynchburg in October 2009, supplementing the Crescent service.

In 2008, Virginia's transportation regulator, the Commonwealth Transportation Board, outlined plans for expanded rail service in the state, including to Roanoke. Following the introduction of state-supported Northeast Regional trains to Lynchburg and Norfolk, the state reached an agreement with the Norfolk Southern Railway in January 2014 to spend about $93 million on infrastructure improvements that would allow passenger service to reach Roanoke.  With the former N&W station having been repurposed as the O. Winston Link Museum, a new station had to be built.

Railroad construction was slated for 2015, improvements to the station and other facilities in Roanoke in 2016, and service would begin in 2017 with a single round trip departing Roanoke for Washington, D.C., in the morning and returning in the evening.  Construction of the Roanoke facilities was delayed; a $4.9 million train storage facility was completed in early February 2017, and work on the $10.9 million station began later in the month, with completion scheduled for the end of the year. On October 31, 2017, after nearly 40 years, passenger service returned to Roanoke.

On July 11, 2022, one Roanoke round trip was added: southbound in the morning and northbound in the afternoon, to complement the existing trip. Both round trips will be extended from Roanoke to Christiansburg in 2025.

See also
 Norfolk and Western Railway Company Historic District

References

External links

Virginia State Rail Plan, Department of Rail and Public Transportation (DRPT)
TrainWeb USA Rail Guide - Roanoke
Article from Railroad Gazette (1904) with original floor plans

Transportation in Roanoke, Virginia
Amtrak stations in Virginia
Railway stations in the United States opened in 2017
Buildings and structures in Roanoke, Virginia
2017 establishments in Virginia
Norfolk and Western Railway stations
Railway stations in the United States opened in 1857
Railway stations closed in 1979
Railway stations closed in 1971
Railway stations in the United States opened in 1975